Nilantha Bopage (born 1 January 1972) is a Sri Lankan former cricketer. He played in 77 first-class and 22 List A matches for various domestic sides in Sri Lanka between 1989 and 2003. He is now an umpire and has stood in matches in the 2017–18 Premier League Tournament.

References

External links
 

1972 births
Living people
Sri Lankan cricketers
Bloomfield Cricket and Athletic Club cricketers
Burgher Recreation Club cricketers
Colombo Cricket Club cricketers
Sebastianites Cricket and Athletic Club cricketers
Sri Lankan cricket umpires
Place of birth missing (living people)